This is a list of candidates of the 1924 South Australian state election.

Retiring MPs

Liberal Federation

 John Godfree (Murray) – lost preselection
 Joseph Anthony Harper (East Torrens) – retired
 George Hussey (Sturt) – lost preselection

Two vacancies for the Northern District in the Legislative Council had remained unfilled following the deaths of John Lewis on 25 August 1923 and John George Bice on 9 November 1923. Both MLCs were not due to be up for re-election in 1924, and their seats were filled at the election in addition to the two Northern District seats that would normally have been contested.

House of Assembly
Sitting members are shown in bold text. Successful candidates are marked with an asterisk.

Legislative Council

Notes

 John Stanley Verran, an incumbent Labor MHA for Port Adelaide, was defeated for Labor preselection in his seat by Frank Condon, and contested Sturt instead.

References

1924 elections in Australia
Candidates for South Australian state elections
1920s in South Australia